In 1944, an uprising took place in Kivu in the eastern Belgian Congo. The cause of the revolt lay in Belgian authority's taxation and communal labor policies, which the Watchtower Movement denounced as ungodly. The revolt, which took place in spring, was a "bitter showdown" and resulted in hundreds of blacks and three whites killed. The leader of the revolt was hanged.

References 

Revolts
Belgian Congo in World War II
1944 in Africa
Conflicts in 1944